Spam may refer to:
 Spam (food), a canned pork meat product

 Spamming, unsolicited or undesired electronic messages
 Email spam, unsolicited, undesired, or illegal email messages
 Messaging spam, spam targeting users of instant messaging (IM) services, SMS or private messages within websites

Art and entertainment 
 Spam (gaming), the repetition of an in-game action
 "Spam" (Monty Python), a comedy sketch
 "Spam", a song on the album It Means Everything (1997), by Save Ferris
 "Spam", a song by "Weird Al" Yankovic on the album UHF – Original Motion Picture Soundtrack and Other Stuff
 Spam Museum, a museum in Austin, Minnesota, US dedicated to the canned pork meat product

Other uses 
 Smooth-particle applied mechanics, the use of smoothed-particle hydrodynamics computation to study impact fractures in solids
 SPAM, a candidate phylum of bacteria

See also